The Six may refer to:

Music
Les Six, a group of six French composers working in Montparnasse in the early 20th century

Television
The 6 (news programme), a local TV news programme in Bristol, England
SC6 (sports program) or The Six, an expanded edition of the ESPN show SportsCenter
The Six, original title of the U.S. version of the Russian game show What? Where? When?, renamed to Million Dollar Mind Game

Other uses 
The Six (film), 2021 documentary about Chinese survivors of the Titanic (六人-泰坦尼克上的中国幸存者)
"The Six", or "The 6ix", a nickname for Toronto coined by Jimmy Prime
The Toronto Six, a professional sports team in the National Women's Hockey League (NWHL); team nickname inspired by the city's nickname
 The Six, a fictional team of six mutants in the Mutant X comic book series
Inner Six or The Six, the founding members of the European Communities
6 (New York City Subway service)

See also
 6 (disambiguation)
 6ix (disambiguation)
 Number Six (disambiguation)
 The Black Six, a 1974 American film